Francisco Andrade Gomes Junior, better known as Chiquinho or Chiquinho Baiano (born 13 March 1980) is a Brazilian footballer discovered by Bahia. He was born in Feira de Santana, and currently plays as a left back for Treze.

Career
Discovered by Bahia in 2000, he has played as a defender.

Career statistics
(Correct )

Honours
Bahia
Campeonato Baiano: 2001
Copa do Nordeste: 2001, 2002
Atlético-GO
Campeão Brasileiro da Série C - 2008

Contract
 Atlético Goianiense.

References

External links
ogol.com 
wspsoccer 

yahoo 

1980 births
Living people
Brazilian footballers
Atlético Clube Goianiense players
Brasiliense Futebol Clube players
Agremiação Sportiva Arapiraquense players
Treze Futebol Clube players
People from Feira de Santana
Association football fullbacks
Sportspeople from Bahia